Cecil Louis Burke, who  performed as Ceelle Burke, was a musician and performer. He was born in Los Angeles. After working with the Norman Thomas Quintette, he joined Curtis Mosby's Blue Blowers. He collaborated with Leon Rene on the song Lovely Hannah. He recorded From Twilight 'Til Dawn with his orchestra on Capitol Records in 1943. Alan Warner and Billy Vera produced. Leon Rene wrote the song. He also played with Jackie Kelso.

Burke recorded several songs on Rene's label Exclusive Records.

Songs
 "Lovely Hannah"
 "From Twilight 'Til Dawn"
 "When the Ships Come Sailing Home Again"
 "Play Me the Blues"
 "Now or Never"
 "Mexico Joe" with Ivie Anderson vocalist
 "Night-Bird", words by Shirley Rey and music by Rey and Burke
 "Whoo'ee Baby", words by Ella Burke
 "This is it", words by Ella Burke

References

External links
 Website page on Ceele including various Billboard clippings and reviews

20th-century American male musicians
Male jazz musicians